Nanzhangqiang is a town under Wen County, in Henan's Jiaozuo municipal region. It has 26,800 residents in an area of 32 km2.

Administration
The town administers 15 village committees (2006). The executive, CPC sub-branch and PSB sub-station (paichusuo 派出所,) are in Nanzhangqiang Village.

Villages
 Nanzhangqiang 
 Beizhangqiang
 Changdian
 Mazhuang
 Zhujiazhuang  
 大渠河村 
 北渠河村 
 南渠河村 
 朱沟村 
 段沟村 
 陆庄村 
 卫沟村 
 杨沟村 
 冉沟村 
 徐沟村

Notes and references

Township-level divisions of Henan
Wen County, Henan